The 2017 ATK season was the club's fourth season since its establishment in 2014 and their fourth season in the Indian Super League. The club ended a three-season association with the Spanish La Liga club Atlético Madrid and was abbreviated to ATK This season the club is coached by Teddy Sheringham and former Bengaluru FC coach, Ashley Westwood is given role of technical director.

Transfers

Pre-season

In:

Out:

During the season

In:

Out:

Players

Current squad

U18 Team

Indian Super League

League table

Matches

Super Cup

Qualification round
As one of the bottom four teams in Indian Super League, ATK entered the Super Cup in the qualifier round where they faced Chennai City for a spot in the Round of 16. The match began with ATK on the front foot as expected. They sealed their berth in the pre-quarter finals by winning the match 4–1.

Super Cup

Qualification round
ATK drawn with Chennai City in qualification stage. They defeated them by 4-1. And qualified for Round of 16.

Round of 16
In the round of 16, ATK was defeated by fellow Indian Super League side, FC Goa 3-1.

Squad statistics

Appearances and goals

Goal scorers

References

ATK (football club) seasons
Atlético de Kolkata